Steven Andrew Moir (born ) is a South African rugby union player for  that played three first class matches for  in 2016; two in the Currie Cup Qualifiers and one in the Currie Cup Premier Division. His regular position is fly-half.

References

South African rugby union players
Living people
1991 births
Rugby union players from Johannesburg
Rugby union fly-halves
Griquas (rugby union) players
White South African people